FC Pinar del Río is a Cuban football team playing in the Cuban National Football League and representing Pinar del Río Province. They play their home games at the Estadio La Bombonera in Pinar del Río.

History
The team won 7 league titles, and was relegated from the Campeonato Nacional in 2014.

Honours
Campeonato Nacional de Fútbol de Cuba: 7
 1987, 1989, 1990, 1992, 1995, 2000, 2006

 CONCACAF Champions' Cup
runner-up: 1989, 1990

 CFU Club Championship:
best performance: 2007, 3rd Group A – First Phase

Performance in CONCACAF competitions

Current squad
2018 Season

Notable players

References

Pinar del Rio
Pinar del Río
1978 establishments in Cuba